Trichophysetis nesias is a moth in the family Crambidae. It is found on Tonga.

References

Cybalomiinae
Moths described in 1886
Moths of Oceania